Hou Yujie (born 13 April 1998) is a Chinese swimmer. He competed in the men's 100 metre freestyle event at the 2018 FINA World Swimming Championships (25 m), in Hangzhou, China. In the same year, he won the silver medal in both the men's 4 × 100 metre freestyle relay and men's 4 × 200 metre freestyle relay events at the 2018 Asian Games held in Jakarta, Indonesia.

References

1998 births
Living people
Chinese male freestyle swimmers
Place of birth missing (living people)
Asian Games medalists in swimming
Asian Games silver medalists for China
Medalists at the 2018 Asian Games
Swimmers at the 2018 Asian Games
21st-century Chinese people